Pope Pius VIII (r. 1829–1830) created six new cardinals in three consistories.

27 July 1829 
 Cesare Nembrini Pironi Gonzaga, bishop of Ancona – cardinal-priest of S. Anastasia (received the title on 28 September 1829), † 5 December 1837
 Remigio Crescini, bishop of Parma – cardinal-priest of S. Giovanni a Porta Latina (received the title on 5 July 1830), † 20 July 1830

15 March 1830 

All the new cardinals received their titles on 5 July 1830.
 Thomas Weld, titular bishop of Amiclea – cardinal-priest of S. Marcello, † 10 April 1837
 Raffaele Mazio – cardinal-priest of S. Maria in Trastevere, † 4 February 1832
 Domenico de Simone, prefect of the Papal Household – cardinal-deacon of S. Angelo in Pescheria, † 9 November 1837

Eight other cardinals were created in pectore but their names were never published.

5 July 1830 
 Louis François-Auguste de Rohan Chabot, archbishop of Besançon – cardinal-priest of SS. Trintà al Monte Pincio (received the title on 28 February 1831), † 8 February 1833

Sources

Pius 8
Pope Pius VIII
19th-century Catholicism
College of Cardinals